The 1868 Ripon by-election was held on 21 December 1868.  The by-election was held due to the incumbent Liberal MP, John Hay, becoming Junior Naval Lord.  It was retained by Hay who was unopposed.

References

1868 elections in the United Kingdom
1868 in England
19th century in Yorkshire
Politics of the Borough of Harrogate
History of Ripon
By-elections to the Parliament of the United Kingdom in North Yorkshire constituencies
Unopposed ministerial by-elections to the Parliament of the United Kingdom in English constituencies
Politics of Ripon
December 1868 events